Vladislav Tovarishchtayovich Khovalyg (born on 24 December 1967) is a Russian politician of Tuvan origin, who is currently the 3rd Head of the Republic of Tuva since 7 April 2021. He is a member of the United Russia party.

He served as the Mayor of Kyzyl from 30 July 2008 to 1 November 2018. He also served as the Minister of Land and Property Relations of the Republic of Tuva from 2007 to 2008.

Biography

Vladislav Khovalyg was born in the village of Teeli, on 24 December 1967.

From 1986 to 1988 he served in the ranks of the Armed Forces of the Soviet Union.

In 1992, he graduated from Krasnoyarsk State University with a degree in jurisprudence, and in 2006 - from the Russian Academy of Public Administration under the President of Russia with a degree in Crisis Management.

After graduating from the university, he began to work in government bodies, becoming the chief specialist on legal issues of the State Committee for Property of the Republic of Tuva.

Then, from 1994 to 2004, he headed the territorial body of the Federal Service of the Russia for Financial Recovery and Bankruptcy in Tuva. He later moved to the Ministry of Finance of the Republic of Tuva, where he successively held the positions of the head of the department and the head of the department.

From April 2007 to July 2008, he was the Minister of Land and Property Relations of the Republic of Tuva.

On 30 July 2008, Khovalyg headed the Kyzyl city administration and as the head of the city. He served two terms in this post. He transferred his powers of mayor to Karim Sagaan-ool on 1 November 2018.

From 9 November 2018 to 7 April 2021, he was the General Director of Tyvaenergosbyt.

Acting Head of the Republic of Tuva

On 7 April 2021, Russian President Vladimir Putin signed a decree appointing Khovalyg as interim head of the Republic of Tuva to replace Sholban Kara-ool, who had retired.

Family

He is married and has two children.

References

See also
Tyva Republic
Head of the Republic of Tyva
Russia
Mayor of Kyzyl
Karim Baylak-oolovich Sagaan-ool
Kyzyl

1967 births
Living people
United Russia politicians
Heads of the Republic of Tuva
Tuvan people
21st-century Russian politicians